Mark Joseph Ross (born August 8, 1954) is a former professional baseball pitcher. He pitched parts of six seasons in Major League Baseball between 1982 until 1990.

Career
Ross was originally drafted by the Houston Astros in the 7th round of the 1979 Major League Baseball Draft. After three years in their farm system, he earned a call-up in September 1982, pitching six innings over four games. He remained with the Houston organization through the end of the 1986 season, with two additional brief stints with the Astros in 1984 and 1985.

Following the 1986 season, Ross pitched in 13 more games, 10 with the Pittsburgh Pirates in 1987 and 1990, and 3 with the Toronto Blue Jays in 1989. Following the 1991, when he pitched for the Richmond Braves, Ross retired as a player. From 1996-99, Ross served as pitching coach for the Danville Braves (1996), Macon Braves (1997–98), and Jamestown Jammers (1999) in the Atlanta Braves farm system and has worked as a scout for the Astros.

References

External links
, or Retrosheet
Pelota Binaria (Venezuelan Winter League)

1954 births
Living people
American expatriate baseball players in Canada
Baseball players from Texas
Buffalo Bisons (minor league) players
Cardenales de Lara players
American expatriate baseball players in Venezuela
Columbus Astros players
Daytona Beach Astros players
Gulf Coast Astros players
Houston Astros players
Houston Astros scouts
Major League Baseball pitchers
Pittsburgh Pirates players
Richmond Braves players
Sportspeople from Galveston, Texas
Syracuse Chiefs players
Texas A&M Aggies baseball players
Toronto Blue Jays players
Tucson Toros players
Vancouver Canadians players